This is a list of recipients of the W. S. Bruce Medal.

Established in 1923, the medal is awarded quinquennially for notable contributions to "Zoology, Botany, Geology, Meteorology, Oceanography or Geography, where new knowledge has been gained through a personal visit to polar regions." and is open to researchers of all nationalities, preferably of Scottish birth or origin, and preferably at the outset of their careers. It commemorates the work of Dr William Spiers Bruce, an explorer and scientific investigator in polar regions.

The award is made and administered by the Royal Scottish Geographical Society in conjunction with
the Royal Society of Edinburgh and the Royal Physical Society of Edinburgh.

Recipients
Source: Royal Scottish Geographical Society

 2019 - Professor Julian Dowdeswell
 2016 – Andy Hein 
 2010 – Alison Cook
 2004 – Dr Michael J Bentley
 1999 – Professor D Marchant
 1994 – Dr Ian Lamont Boyd
 1987 – Dr J E Gordon
 1980 – Dr A Clarke
 1977 – Dr Peter Wadhams
 1972 – Dr P Friend
 1968 – Dr William Stanley Bryce Paterson
 1966 – Dr S Evans
 1964 – Dr Martin Wyatt Holdgate
 1962 – Ken V Blaiklock
 1960 – J MacDowall
 1958 – Dr Hal Lister
 1956 – J W Cowie
 1954 – Dr Richard Maitland Laws
 1952 – Gordon de Quetteville Robin
 1950 – Dr Maxwell John Dunbar
 1948 – Dr W A Deer
 1946 – Lt-Col Patrick Douglas Baird
 1944 – Lieutenant Thomas Henry Manning
 1942 – Dr George Colin Lawder Bertram
 1940 – Brian Birley Roberts
 1938 – Alexander Richard Glen
 1936 – James William Slessor Marr
 1932 – Henry George "Gino" Watkins
 1930 – Neil Alison Mackintosh
 1928 – Harald Ulrik Sverdrup
 1926 – James Mann Wordie

See also
List of general science and technology awards
List of awards named after people
William Speirs Bruce

References

External links
 Medal citations
 W. S. Bruce Medal | Royal Scottish Geographical Society

Geographic societies
British awards
Awards established in 1923